One New York Night (also released as The Trunk Mystery) is a 1935 American comedy film directed by Jack Conway and written by Frank Davis. The film stars Franchot Tone, Una Merkel, Conrad Nagel, Harvey Stephens, Steffi Duna and Charles Starrett. The film was released on March 3, 1935, by Metro-Goldwyn-Mayer. It was based on the West End play Sorry You've Been Troubled by Walter C. Hackett, which had previously been made into the 1932 British film Life Goes On.

Plot summary

Cast 
 Franchot Tone as Foxhall Ridgeway
 Una Merkel as Phoebe
 Conrad Nagel as Kent
 Harvey Stephens as Collis
 Steffi Duna as Countess Louise Broussiloff
 Charles Starrett as George Sheridan
 Louise Henry as Ermine
 Tom Dugan as Selby
 Harold Huber as Blake
 Henry Kolker as Arthur Carlisle

Reception
Writing for The Spectator, Graham Greene praised the film as "a comedy of astonishing intelligence and finish". Greene emphasized the "witty dialogue, [and] the quick intelligent acting" of Tone and Merkel, commenting that the film felt "[bathed] in an atmosphere fantastic, daring and pleasantly heartless".

See also 
 Life Goes On (1932)

References

External links 
 
 
 
 

1935 films
American comedy films
1935 comedy films
Metro-Goldwyn-Mayer films
Films directed by Jack Conway
American black-and-white films
Films set in hotels
American remakes of British films
American films based on plays
Films based on adaptations
1930s English-language films
1930s American films